{{Taxobox
| image = Pareulype berberata.jpg
| image_caption =  Pareulype berberata 
| regnum = Animalia
| phylum = Arthropoda
| classis = Insecta
| ordo = Lepidoptera
| familia = Geometridae
| subfamilia = Larentiinae
| tribus = Rheumapterini
| genus = Pareulype| genus_authority = 
| subdivision_ranks = Species
| subdivision = 
}}Pareulype' is a genus of moths in the family Geometridae.

Species in EuropePareulype berberata (Denis & Schiffermüller, 1775)Pareulype casearia (Constant 1884)Pareulype lasithiotica'' (Rebel 1906)

References

Fauna Europaea
Natural History Museum Lepidoptera genus database

Geometridae genera
Rheumapterini